Gerda Amalie Holst Christophersen (1870–1947) was a Danish stage and film actress, singer, theatre director and writer. From 1911, she starred in numerous early Danish films, including 15 from Nordisk Film.

Biography
Born Gerda Amalie Holst Christophersen on 1 March 1870 in Copenhagen, Gerda Amalie Holst Christophersen was the daughter of the opera singer Harald Edvard Christensen and his wife Ernesta Felicita Simonsen, who also came from a family of musicians. Christophersen began her career as a stage actress in 1889 at the Casino Theatre, also taking small parts at the Royal Danish Theatre until the late 1990s.

Her singing career began in 1894 when her father took her on an operatic concert tour in which she sang excerpts from Faust. From 1897 to 1900 she toured with Albert Helsengreen's theatre company, gaining fame by singing the leads in Frøken Nitouche and Den skønne Galathea as well as Adele in Die Fledermaus.

Filmopgraphy
 1911	Den farlige alder as Enkegrevinde Elsie von Lindtner
 1911	Gøglerblod as Miranda, gøgler
 1914	Gyldne lænker as Mercedes, Cartwright's, niece
 1915	Det evige had as Jens' mother
 1915	Helten fra Østafrika	
 1915	Hjertefejlen as	Fru Holm
 1915	To mand frem for en enke as Enkefru Fager
 1916	Den hvide djævel as	Asia
 1916	Doktor Gar el Hama IV as Grevinde Sinclair
 1916	Ene i verden as Komtesse Luigi, svindlerske
 1916	Hvem er hun? as	Fru Taylor
 1916	Letsindighedens løn	Rosa, oberstens datter
 1916	Paraplyen as Fru Holm
 1917	Askepot	
 1917	Handlen med menneskeliv as Fru Gillemot
 1917	Hvor sorgerne glemmes	Fyrstinde as Sara von Staffenfeldt
 1939	Genboerne as Madame Schmidt

Theatre career
Theatre roles
Casino
 1905	Dukken	Fru Hilarius
 1906	Yduns æbler as	Freia
 1916	Flagermusen as Rosalinde, Einsteins hustru

Dagmar Theatre
 1928	Wien as Wien - oh Josephine	 

Royal Danish Theatre
 1897	John Gabriel Borkman as Maid

 Det Lille Teater
 1922	Flamme as Ferdinand's mother

 Friluftsteatret i Dyrehaven
 1910	En skærsommernatsdrøm as Hippolita

GERDA CHRISTOPHERSEN TOURNEEN
 1927	Cirkusprinsessen	 

 Odense Theatre
 1899	Frøken Nitouche as Denise
 1899	Pernilles korte frøkenstand	
 1923	Madame D'Ora as	Madame D'Ora

Scala Theatre
 1926	Adieu Mimi as Generaldirektørens kone
 1923	Madame D'Ora as	Madame D'Ora
 1927	Cirkusprinsessen as	Carla Schlumberger, hotelejer

Aarhus Theatre
 1900	Prinsessen på ærten as Prinsesse
 1901	Agnes Jordan as	Agnes Jordan
 1901	Elverhøj as Elisabeth Munk
 1901	Frøken Nitouche as Denise
 1911	Madame Sans Gene as Catherine
 1911	Cornevilles klokker as Serpolette
 1911	Elverhøj as	Mor Karen
 1911	Frøken Nitouche as Denise

Director
 Odense Theatre
 1931	Geisha	 
 1932	I begyndelse var ordet	 

Skovbakkens Sommerteater
 1936	Aalborg Sommerrevy

References

1870 births
1947 deaths
Danish stage actresses
Danish film actresses
Danish silent film actresses
Danish theatre directors
19th-century Danish women singers
Danish women memoirists
19th-century Danish memoirists
20th-century Danish memoirists
Danish women writers
Recipients of Ingenio et Arti